Matthew T Tarrant (born 11 July 1990) is a British rower.

Rowing career
Tarrant won a gold medal in the eight at the 2014 World Championships in Bosbaan, Amsterdam. He was part of the British team that topped the medal table at the 2015 World Rowing Championships at Lac d'Aiguebelette in France, where he won a gold medal as part of the coxed pair with Nathaniel Reilly-O'Donnell and Henry Fieldman.

He won a bronze medal at the 2017 World Rowing Championships in Sarasota, Florida, as part of the coxless four. He then won a bronze medal at the 2018 World Rowing Championships in Plovdiv, Bulgaria, as part of the eight with James Rudkin, Alan Sinclair, Tom Ransley, Thomas George, Moe Sbihi, Oliver Wynne-Griffith, Will Satch and Fieldman. He won another bronze medal the following year at the 2019 World Rowing Championships in Ottensheim, Austria as part of the eight with George, Rudkin, Josh Bugajski, Sbihi, Jacob Dawson, Wynne-Griffith, Thomas Ford and Fieldman.

References

External links

Matthew Tarrant – British Rowing profile

1990 births
Living people
British male rowers
World Rowing Championships medalists for Great Britain